Malacopteron is a genus of passerine birds in the family Pellorneidae.

Species
The genus contains the following species:

References

Collar, N. J. & Robson, C. 2007. Family Timaliidae (Babblers)  pp. 70 – 291 in; del Hoyo, J., Elliott, A. & Christie, D.A. eds. Handbook of the Birds of the World, Vol. 12. Picathartes to Tits and Chickadees. Lynx Edicions, Barcelona.

 
Pellorneidae
Bird genera
Taxa named by Thomas Campbell Eyton
Taxonomy articles created by Polbot